Felimare fregona is a species of sea slug, a dorid nudibranch, a shell-less marine gastropod mollusk in the family Chromodorididae.

Taxonomy
This species was described under the name Hypselodoris fregona from the Caribbean Sea in 2013. Although Johnson & Gosliner transferred all eastern Pacific, Atlantic and Mediterranean species of Hypselodoris to the genus Felimare in 2012, the authors of this species argue against this decision.

Distribution 
This species was described from Pointe sur baie de Baille Argent, Guadeloupe, . Distribution of Felimare fregona includes Venezuela, Puerto Rico, Virgin Islands, Curaçao, Guadeloupe and Panama.

Description
The body is elongate, narrow, with the posterior portion of foot extending beyond the mantle margin. Background color is white with irregular shades of pale blue and gray. Dorsum is with three longitudinal yellow lines. Mantle margin is edged by an opaque white line with a narrow submarginal band of yellow and a series of black circular spots. Rhinophores are white with a purple longitudinal line up from the base. It is up to 40 mm long.

Ecology
Felimare fregona feeds on a blue sponge.

References
This article incorporates Creative Commons (CC-BY-4.0) text from the reference

Chromodorididae
Gastropods described in 2013